Tuvaluan can mean:

 The Tuvaluan language, an Austronesian language spoken in Tuvalu, Fiji, Kiribati, Nauru and New Zealand
 Anything to do with the Oceanian island nation of Tuvalu
 Tuvaluan people

Language and nationality disambiguation pages